Botryococcene C-methyltransferase (TMT-3) is an enzyme with systematic name S-adenosyl-L-methionine:botryococcene C-methyltransferase.

Function 
This enzyme catalyses the following chemical reaction:

 2 S-adenosyl-L-methionine + C30 botryococcene  2 S-adenosyl-L-homocysteine + 3,20-dimethyl-1,2,21,22-tetradehydro-2,3,20,21-tetrahydrobotryococcene (overall reaction)
(1a) S-adenosyl-L-methionine + C30 botryococcene  S-adenosyl-L-homocysteine + 3-methyl-1,2-didehydro-2,3-dihydrobotryococcene
(1b) S-adenosyl-L-methionine + 3-methyl-1,2-didehydro-2,3-dihydrobotryococcene  S-adenosyl-L-homocysteine + 3,20-dimethyl-1,2,21,22-tetradehydro-2,3,20,21-tetrahydrobotryococcene
(2a) S-adenosyl-L-methionine + C30 botryococcene  S-adenosyl-L-homocysteine + 20-methyl-21,22-didehydro-20,21-dihydrobotryococcene
(2b) S-adenosyl-L-methionine + 20-methyl-21,22-didehydro-20,21-dihydrobotryococcene  S-adenosyl-L-homocysteine + 3,20-dimethyl-1,2,21,22-tetradehydro-2,3,20,21-tetrahydrobotryococcene

This enzyme is isolated from the green alga Botryococcus braunii BOT22.

References

External links 
 

EC 2.1.1